Victor "Torreke" Lemberechts (18 May 1924 – 24 June 1992) was a Belgian international footballer who played as striker.

Lemberechts played professionally for KV Mechelen between 1942 and 1956. He made 346 appearances and scored 128 goals.

Lemberechts also earned 42 caps for the Belgian national side between 1945 and 1955, scoring 14 goals, including playing in two FIFA World Cup qualifying matches.

References

1924 births
1992 deaths
Belgian footballers
Belgium international footballers
K.V. Mechelen players
Sportspeople from Mechelen
Footballers from Antwerp Province
Association football forwards